Anusha is an Indian actress. She started her film career at the early age of 13 and was one of the prominent lead actress in Malayalam, Telugu and Kannada movies during 1990s and 2000s. She has also acted in Telugu serials later in her career. She is the daughter of Tamil actress K. R. Savithri. Actress K. R. Vijaya is her aunt. She lives in Chennai with her family. She was a former basketball player at State levels and was a tall actress. Anusha married Saravanan in June, 2007.

Filmography

TV serials
 Gruhalakshmi (Telugu) as Lakshmi
 Ninne Pelladatha (Telugu) as Supraja
 Jayam (Telugu) as Seetha and Geetha
 Anubhandham (Telugu) as Anu

References

External links

Actresses in Malayalam cinema
Actresses in Tamil cinema
Living people
Actresses in Telugu cinema
Indian film actresses
Actresses in Kannada cinema
Indian child actresses
20th-century Indian actresses
21st-century Indian actresses
Actresses in Hindi cinema
Actresses from Chennai
Female models from Chennai
Year of birth missing (living people)
Actresses in Telugu television
Actresses in Malayalam television